Feng Gang (born 6 March 1993 in Wuhan) is a Chinese football player who currently plays for Shaanxi Chang'an Athletic in the China League One.

Club career
Feng started his professional football career in 2011 when he was loaned to China League Two club Wenzhou Provenza from Hangzhou Greentown for one year. He was promoted to Hangzhou Greentown's first team squad by Takeshi Okada in 2012. On 17 March, he made his Super League debut in the second round of the season which Hangzhou Greentown lost to Jiangsu Sainty 3–0, coming on as a substitute for Wang Kai in the 75th minute. He scored his first senior goal at his first start for the club, in a 2–1 home victory against Liaoning Whowin on 12 May. Feng became the regular player of the team after this match and continued to score twice (v Shanghai Shenhua on 4 August and v Dalian Shide on 25 August) in the 2012 league season.

On 27 February 2018, Feng transferred to Chinese Super League side Hebei China Fortune.

International career
Feng was first called up into China U-17's squad in March 2010, and received his first called up for China U-20 by Su Maozhen in December 2010. He played for China U-20 in the 2011 Granatkin Memorial, 2011 Toulon Tournament and 2011 Weifang Cup. However, he was excluded from the squad for 2012 AFC U-19 Championship qualification held by Malaysia in October 2011.

On 14 January 2017, Feng made his debut for Chinese national team in the third-place playoff of 2017 China Cup against Croatia, coming on as a substitute for Gao Zhunyi in the half time.

Career statistics 
Statistics accurate as of match played 31 December 2020.

References

External links

 

Living people
1993 births
Association football midfielders
Chinese footballers
Footballers from Wuhan
Zhejiang Professional F.C. players
Henan Songshan Longmen F.C. players
Hebei F.C. players
Chinese Super League players
China League Two players
Footballers at the 2014 Asian Games
China international footballers
Asian Games competitors for China